Russell Earl Cochran (born October 31, 1958) is an American professional golfer who plays on the PGA Tour Champions, having previously been a member on the PGA Tour and the Nationwide Tour. He is one of the few natural left-handed players to win a PGA Tour event. For much of the 1980s through 1992, he was the only left-hander on the PGA Tour.

Cochran was born, raised and has lived most of his life in Paducah, Kentucky. He grew up playing on Paxton Park Public Golf Course in Paducah, as did fellow PGA Tour player Kenny Perry, who came along a couple years later. After graduating from St. Mary High School in Paducah, he attended the University of Kentucky and was a member of the golf team. He turned pro in 1979 and joined the PGA Tour in 1982.

Cochran has about 60 top-10 finishes in official PGA Tour events including a victory at the 1991 Centel Western Open when he made up seven shots over eight holes to beat Greg Norman.  His career year was 1991, when in addition to his win at the Western Open, he had two second-place finishes—including a playoff loss to Craig Stadler at the Tour Championship – and a third and finished 10th on the money list. His best finish in a major was a tie for seventh at the 1992 PGA Championship. Cochran set the Valhalla Golf Club course record (65) in the third round of the 1996 PGA Championship which stood until broken (63) in the same tournament four years later by José María Olazábal. He played some on the Nationwide Tour in his mid-to-late 40s in preparation for the Champions Tour. His best Nationwide finish was a tie for third at the 2003 Chitimacha Louisiana Open.

Cochran debuted on the Champions Tour with a tie for seventh at the Allianz Championship on February 15, 2009, at Boca Raton, Florida. He finished third at the U.S. Senior Open on August 2, 2009, at Carmel, Indiana, setting the Crooked Stick Golf Club course record with a third-round score of 8-under par 64. He ended the year by winning the Rookie of the Year award. In 2010, he earned his first victory on the Champions Tour, defeating Fred Funk on the first hole of a sudden-death playoff in the Posco E&C Songdo Championship in South Korea, and followed that up with another win in the tour's next event, the SAS Championship in North Carolina.

Cochran won his maiden senior major championship at the 2011 Senior British Open Championship at Walton Heath. Cochran finished two strokes ahead of the third round leader Mark Calcavecchia. He shot a final round 67 which included six birdies in the first ten holes to open up a five stroke advantage. Despite a late charge by Calcavecchia, Cochran parred the last four holes and held on for a two stroke victory. Afterwards Cochran claimed having his son on the bag was a factor in his success. "It feels great, I had my son (Reed) on the bag, I told him I was going to work hard and come away with something good and I think he was the lucky charm."

In June 2013, Cochran won for the fourth time on the Champions Tour at the Principal Charity Classic. He came from two shots back with a final round 67 to finish a single stroke ahead of Jay Don Blake. This ended a two-year title drought that Cochran had spent battling rib and wrist injuries. In October 2013, he won his second title of the year at the SAS Championship, where he finished with four consecutive birdies to beat David Frost by a single stroke.

Cochran and his wife, Jackie, have four children: three sons and a daughter. His oldest son, Ryan, played golf at the University of Florida and aspires to play professionally like his father. Russ's son Case and nephew Rick III are also professional golfers.

Professional wins (11)

PGA Tour wins (1)

PGA Tour playoff record (0–1)

Tournament Players Series wins (2)

*Note: The 1983 Magnolia Classic was shortened to 54 holes due to weather.

Other wins (3)

Other playoff record (0–1)

Sources:

Champions Tour wins (5)

Champions Tour playoff record (1–1)

Results in major championships

CUT = missed the half-way cut
"T" = tied

Summary

Most consecutive cuts made – 4 (1992 U.S. Open – 1993 Masters)
Longest streak of top-10s – 1 (twice)

Results in The Players Championship

CUT = missed the halfway cut
WD = withdrew
"T" = Tied

Senior major championships

Wins (1)

Results timeline
Results not in chronological order before 2022.

CUT = missed the half-way cut
WD = withdrew
"T" = tied
NT = No tournament due to COVID-19 pandemic

See also
1982 PGA Tour Qualifying School graduates
1995 PGA Tour Qualifying School graduates
2001 PGA Tour Qualifying School graduates
2003 PGA Tour Qualifying School graduates

References

External links

American male golfers
Kentucky Wildcats men's golfers
PGA Tour golfers
PGA Tour Champions golfers
Winners of senior major golf championships
Golfers from Kentucky
Left-handed golfers
Sportspeople from Paducah, Kentucky
St. Mary High School (Paducah, Kentucky) alumni
1958 births
Living people